Jacques Garelli (June 2, 1931 – December 24, 2014) was a French-language poet and philosopher, author of more than fifteen works.

Biography 
A former UNESCO expert in Zaire (Africa) with the historian of Africa Aurelio Pace, the father of the artist Joseph Pace, he taught at Yale University (United States), New York University (NYU - USA)  and Amiens University (France). Influenced by the thought of Martin Heidegger and of Maurice Merleau-Ponty, the main object of his philosophical research remains phenomenology and ontology.

Bibliography

Poetry
 Brèche, Paris, Mercure de France, 1966
 Les Dépossessions suivi de Prendre appui, Paris, Mercure de France, 1968
 Lieux Précaires, Paris, Mercure de France, 1972
 L’Ubiquité d’être suivi de Difficile Séjour, Paris, José Corti, 1986
 Archives du Silence suivi de Récurrences du Songe, Paris, José Corti, 1989
 L’Entrée en Démesure, suivi de L’Écoute et le regard, Paris, José Corti, 1995
 Brèche / Les Dépossessions / Lieux Précaires, Encre Marine, Fougères - La Versanne, 2000
 Fragments d’un corps en archipel suivi de Perception et imaginaire. Réflexions sur un poème oublié de Rimbaud, Paris, José Corti, 2008
 Fulgurations de l'être, José Corti, 2011

Philosophy / Aesthetics
 La Gravitation Poétique, Paris, Mercure de France, 1966
 Le Recel et la Dispersion, Paris, Gallimard, « Bibliothèque des Idées », 1978
 Artaud et la Question du Lieu, Paris, José Corti, 1982
 Le Temps des Signes, Paris, Klincksieck, 1983
 Rythmes et Mondes, Grenoble, Jérôme Millon, 1991
 Introduction au Logos du Monde esthétique. De la Chôra platonicienne au Schématisme transcendantal kantien et à l’expérience phénoménologique du Monde, Paris, Beauchêsne, 2000
 De l’entité à l’événement. La phénoménologie à l’épreuve de la science et de l’art contemporains, Milan / Paris, Mimesis, 2004
 La mort et le songe, Milan / Paris, Mimesis, 2007

References

External links
 Enciclopedia Italiana Treccani  (in Italian)
 Joseph Pace Filtranisme, intervista, woobook, pagg. 17 and 18  (in Italian)
 BNF Biblliothèque nationale de France

1931 births
2014 deaths
French philosophers
French poets
20th-century Serbian philosophers
21st-century Serbian philosophers
Serbian male poets
French male poets
French male non-fiction writers